Wellworths was a supermarket chain, owned by the Fitzwilton trading in Northern Ireland until 1997. Along with Stewarts/Crazy Prices it was one of the two main supermarkets in Northern Ireland until English-based retailers moved into the marketplace.

History
Wellworths was split into three.  Smaller stores were wholly acquired by the Musgrave Group in 1997 and traded as Wellworths-SuperValu for a time.  The Wellworths name was eventually dropped and these stores now trade as 'Supervalu', part of an all-Ireland chain.

Larger Wellworths stores were acquired by Safeway Stores (Ireland), a joint venture between Fitzwilton and Safeway.  They operated from 1997 to 2005 under the Safeway name.

Some other stores became a branch of Marks and Spencer and some other retail brands.

In March 2004, Safeway Stores (Ireland) was acquired by Morrisons when Morrisons bought Safeway. The Northern Ireland stores were not part of Morrisons' long-term strategy and traded under the Morrison name for a limited time. Despite continuing to trade as Safeway, own-brand products and carrier bags were supplied by Morrisons. Safeway Stores (Ireland) was acquired by Asda in 2005 and now operates under the Asda name.

Defunct retail companies of the United Kingdom
Retail companies disestablished in 1997
Supermarkets of Northern Ireland
Defunct supermarkets of the United Kingdom
1997 disestablishments in the United Kingdom
Defunct companies of Northern Ireland